The German beach soccer team represents Germany in international beach soccer competitions and is controlled by the G.F.A, the governing body for football in Germany.

Competitive record

FIFA Beach Soccer World Cup Qualification (UEFA)

Current squad
Correct as of April 2017

Coach: Sebastian Ulrich

Achievements
 Euro Beach Soccer League
 Winner (1): 1998

References

External links
 BSWW Profile
 Profile on Beach Soccer Russia

European national beach soccer teams
National sports teams of Germany
Football in Germany